Tahhan or alternative Tahan (in Arabic طحان) is a surname and may refer to:

Bassam Tahhan, Syrian-born French professor of Arabic literature and expert on the Quran
Hussein al-Tahan or al-Tahhan (born 1955), the governor of Baghdad, Iraq from 2005 to 2009
James Tahhan (born 1988), Venezuelan chef, television personality, restaurateur, and author
Maya Tahan (born 1999), Israeli tennis player
Mohamed Zein Tahan (or Zein Tahhan or Tahhan), (born 1990), Lebanese footballer

See also
Carolin Tahhan Fachakh, or Sister Carol, Syrian nun who cared for women and children in Damascus during the Syrian Civil War.